The  Intercontinental Futsal Cup is an international club competition for futsal. This is a friendly competition and not a FIFA official trophy. A group of invited clubs from Europe and South America play 3 games against each other. These are generally the Champions but not always (e.g. the European Champion of 2019 Sporting Clube de Portugal was not invited).

History 
The Intercontinental Futsal Cup is held every year. The first event was held in 1997, in Porto Alegre. This tournament is not an official trophy,. Since 2016 is organized by LNFS and the Football Federation of Qatar.

List of champions

Titles by club

Titles by country

References

External links 
2008 Intercontinental Futsal Cup RSSSF Archive
2007 Intercontinental Futsal Cup RSSSF Archive
2006 Intercontinental Futsal Cup RSSSF Archive
2005 Intercontinental Futsal Cup RSSSF Archive
2004 Intercontinental Futsal Cup RSSSF Archive

International club futsal competitions
FIFA club competitions
International futsal competitions
Multi-national professional sports leagues